The Golden Age of Wireless is the debut album by English musician Thomas Dolby. Originally released in May 1982, the album was reissued in a number of different configurations, with later resequencings including the pop hit "She Blinded Me with Science".

Background
Preceding the album, Dolby allowed a demo of "Airwaves" to be included on a collection titled From Brussels with Love, published in December 1980 by Belgian label Les Disques Du Crépuscule. In response to friends urging him to put out a single, Dolby released his first 45 rpm 7-inch single, "Urges" backed with "Leipzig", on 18 February 1981. Under the imprint of London-based Armageddon Records, the single was co-produced by Andy Partridge of XTC, who also played percussion on the track. Sounds magazine reviewed "Urges" positively, calling Dolby a "new romantic... A Futurist Rundgren perhaps?" None of these songs were announced as singles for an upcoming album, but they later appeared on some editions of Golden Age of Wireless.

During April–May 1981, Dolby stayed in New York to join the album project 4 by Foreigner. Producer Mutt Lange requested him on the strength of a demo tape Dolby had given to Zomba Publishing, a firm with Lange serving as a partner. Dolby's synthesizer work gave the album a polished sheen, especially his Brian Eno–like ambient synth intro to "Waiting for a Girl Like You". The monies earned from his session work for Foreigner allowed him to finance The Golden Age of Wireless, and the 4 album credit brought him greater notice. Dolby also toured with Foreigner sporadically in late 1981 and 1982, to promote 4 in concert.

While working on Golden Age of Wireless, Dolby was involved in several side projects. He wrote the song "New Toy" for Lene Lovich, about his new Fairlight CMI synthesizer. In May 1981, Dolby produced the single "Dream Soldiers" by the Fallout Club, a band for which Dolby sang and played synthesizers. The Fallout Club was signed to Happy Birthday Records. In August, Dolby released a cover of the Joni Mitchell song "The Jungle Line" as a single under the artist name Low Noise, his own project on Happy Birthday Records. He was inspired to make the recording after hearing Mitchell's 1975 album The Hissing of Summer Lawns. The Fallout Club disbanded toward the end of 1981. Dolby played live shows in London, including dates at the Heaven and the Albany Empire in April 1982.

Three more of Dolby's songs appeared in late 1981 and early 1982: "Europa and the Pirate Twins" came out on 15 September 1981 as another independent Dolby single; "Airwaves" was issued on 30 January 1982; and "Radio Silence" was released on 25 March, accompanied by the announcement of the upcoming album. "Europa" reached No. 45 in Canada.

Composition
In a September 2009 interview with Drowned in Sound, following the release of the "Collector's Edition" of the album, Dolby reflected on his overall theme and approach to the songs:

The music of "Europa and the Pirate Twins" is a deliberate merging of past and present, combining modern synthesizers with blues harmonica playing and electronic percussion with handclaps. The central character in "Radio Silence" is a personification of Radio Caroline, a 1960s British pirate radio station.

Release
The Golden Age of Wireless was finally released on 13 May 1982. EMI Records manufactured and distributed the aforementioned singles and the album, supporting Dolby's own Venice in Peril (VIP) label. VIP was named for the steady process of Venice sinking under water. Dolby said he would donate part of the label profits to stop the flooding of Venice.

The album was released five times, in different formats and layouts. All five releases appeared on vinyl, but only the third and fifth versions appeared on CD, with each changing the order of the songs, replacing the album mixes with extended or single mixes and even adding and removing entire songs. In the case of "Radio Silence", a completely different recording with prominent guitars was the version used on the early US incarnations.

The first US version, issued by Capitol-EMI's Harvest Records imprint, excised the instrumental "The Wreck of the Fairchild" and added the two sides of Dolby's first single, "Leipzig" and "Urges". Additionally, Capitol swapped the original synth-pop version of "Radio Silence" for a more rock-oriented version that had previously only been available as a single B-side in the UK. Capitol also opted for the single edit of "Airwaves" and abandoned the original UK "comic book" cover in favour of a shot of Dolby on a stage during the production of Bertholt Brecht's Life of Galileo. This image had previously been used as the cover of the "Europa and the Pirate Twins" single in the UK.

After Dolby released the single "She Blinded Me with Science" (with an accompanying music video) on 23 October 1982, backed with "One of Our Submarines", Capitol removed "Urges" and "Leipzig" from the album, added the extended version of "Science" (also known as the "US Mix") and "Submarines", and changed the album's cover art back to its original "comic book" design. Capitol also swapped the full-length version of "Windpower" for the single version (with an edited intro and outro).

In 1983, Dolby's UK record label, Venice in Peril, followed suit and reissued the album with a similar track listing to the second US version. They opted for the short single version of "Science" but retained the full-length versions of "Airwaves" and "Windpower" and the original synthesizer-driven version of "Radio Silence", just as all three had appeared on the first UK edition. This is the edition that is widely available on CD to this day, on both sides of the Atlantic.

A remastered "Collector's Edition" of The Golden Age of Wireless was released on 13 July 2009, complete with bonus tracks, personal sleeve notes and a DVD of the Live Wireless music video.

Reception

Critical
In October 1982, Don Shewey of Rolling Stone magazine awarded The Golden Age of Wireless four stars out of five, calling it "one of the most impressive debuts" of 1982. Shewey compared the album's melodicism to the works of Paul McCartney and concluded that "unlike many synthesizer bands from England, Dolby eschews morbid, droogy drones." In December, Connor Cochran of Musician magazine said the album was "the best damned record to come out of Europe's current fascination with synth-pop. Period." He added, "Dolby is purely amazing. And best of all, he writes songs." In The Trouser Press Guide to New Wave Records (1983), Trouser Press writer Steven Grant praised the album, stating, "Besides demonstrating an unfailing flair for sharp, snappy compositions, Dolby shows himself unusually capable of getting warm, touching feeling out of his synthesizers and his voice, creating an evocative sound that magnificently straddles nostalgia and futurism." However, Trouser Press later dismissed the album's follow-up single, "She Blinded Me With Science", as "insufferable."

In a retrospective review for AllMusic, Ned Raggett called the album "an intriguing and often very entertaining curio from the glory days of synth pop", comparing Dolby favorably to David Bowie, Bryan Ferry and Gary Numan. Raggett concluded that "Dolby's melodies are sprightly without being annoyingly perky, his singing warm, and his overall performance a pleasant gem."

Commercial
The Golden Age of Wireless sold very well in the US, peaking at No. 13 on the Billboard album chart in mid-June 1983. "She Blinded Me with Science" had already become a major hit, receiving constant radio and MTV airplay and reaching No. 5 on the Billboard Hot 100 in May. "Europa and the Pirate Twins" did not fare as well in the US, peaking at No. 67 in July.

Track listing

All songs written by Thomas Dolby, except "Commercial Breakup" and "She Blinded Me With Science", by Dolby and Jo Kerr.

1982 First UK release: Venice in Peril VIP 1001

The original UK track listing (including its reappearance on the 2009 Collector's Edition CD) is the only place one can hear the progression of "The Wreck of the Fairchild" into "Airwaves" and then into the synth version of "Radio Silence". "Fairchild" concludes with the sound of various electronics, including a wave computer, which segues into the intro of "Airwaves" with no break. The remnants of this transition can still be heard at the beginning of the full-length version of "Airwaves" used on other configurations of the album.

1982 First US release: Harvest ST-12203
Compared to the original UK release, the initial US release deletes "The Wreck of the Fairchild", adds "Urges" and "Leipzig", and presents an edited version of "Airwaves" and an entirely re-recorded version of "Radio Silence".

1983 Second US release: Capitol ST-12271
Compared to the original US release, the second US release deletes "Urges" and "Leipzig", adds "One of Our Submarines" and an extended version of "She Blinded Me with Science", and presents an edited version of "Windpower".

A third US version restores the original electronic version of "Radio Silence".

1983 Second UK release: Venice In Peril/EMI VIP 107,607-1
Compared to the original UK release, the second UK release deletes "The Wreck of the Fairchild" and adds "One of Our Submarines" and the short version of "She Blinded Me with Science". The 1983 UK CD release (EMI CDP 7 46009 2) and 1984 US CD release (Capitol CDP 7 46009 2) both feature the same set of tracks listed here.

2009 Remastered Collector's Edition CD: EMI 50999 2 67915 2 4
This version includes the original UK album tracks, in sequence, as tracks 1–9. Bonus tracks 10–14 were previously included on various re-issues during 1982–84. "Therapy/Growth (Demo)" was released on the "Europa and the Pirate Twins" singles, without the demo credit. A full recording was made, but has not been legitimately released. "Airwaves (Demo)" first appeared on the 1980 compilation cassette From Brussels with Love (the first release by the label Les Disques du Crépuscule), which has been reissued at various times as a double LP, CD and deluxe 2-CD set. Track 15 was initially released as the B-side of the Low Noise single "The Jungle Line" but was overdubbed for this release with a new harmony vocal by Dolby's son Harper Robertson. 18 and 19 are previously unreleased.

Also included with this release is a DVD containing a remastered version of the long-form performance video Live Wireless, recorded at the Riverside Theatre Studios, London, and originally released on videocassette on 9 November 1983 by Picture Music International (TVE 901572).

2019 Echo/BMG rerelease
In November 2019, BMG division the Echo Label, which acquired Dolby's catalogue from Warner Music Group in 2017, rereleased the record on vinyl and CD. The "splatter vinyl" edition (Echo 7157) repeats the track sequence of the original UK release, with "She Blinded Me With Science" added as the final track. The CD edition (BMGCAT402CD) consists of the first 14 tracks of the 2009 remaster but with "Radio Silence (Guitar Version)" moved to the final track, following "Urges" and "Leipzig".

Personnel

Musicians
 Thomas Dolby – vocals, drum programs (tracks 1, 5, 8; "She Blinded Me With Science", "One of Our Submarines"), piano (tracks 1, 3, 6, 7, 9), wave computer (tracks 1, 3–5, 8, 9; "She Blinded Me With Science", "One of Our Submarines"), synthesizer (tracks 2–4, 7; "Leipzig", "Urges", "Radio Silence (Guitar Version)"), monk voice (track 3), backing vocals (tracks 3, 4, 6, 7, 9; "Radio Silence (Guitar Version)"), electronic percussion (track 4), kalimba (track 6)
 James Allen – backing vocals (tracks 3, 9)
 Kevin Armstrong – guitar (tracks 1, 4, 6, 7, 9; "Radio Silence (Guitar Version)", "She Blinded Me With Science", "One of Our Submarines"), backing vocals ("One of Our Submarines")
 Dave Birch – guitar (track 1), monk voice (track 3), backing vocals ("Radio Silence (Guitar Version)")
 Bosco – percussion ("Radio Silence (Guitar Version)")
 Les Chappell – backing vocals (tracks 3, 4, 9)
 Judy Evans – backing vocals (tracks 3, 9)
 Lesley Fairbairn – backing vocals (tracks 1, 3, 9)
 Mark Heyward-Chaplin – bass guitar (tracks 2–4, 6, 7, 9)
 Justin Hildreth – backwards percussion (track 1), drums (tracks 2–4, 6, 7, 9; "Radio Silence (Guitar Version)")
 Simon House – violin ("She Blinded Me With Science")
 Tim Kerr – violin ("Leipzig")
 Mutt Lange – backing vocals ("She Blinded Me With Science")
 Simon Lloyd – leadline bass, flute (track 5)
 Lene Lovich – backing vocals (tracks 3, 9), mantra ("Radio Silence (Guitar Version)")
 John Marsh – shipping forecast (track 5)
 Daniel Miller – synthesizer (track 8)
 Guido Orlando – Chilean translations, distress, Grace (track 6)
 Andy Partridge – harmonica (track 4), percussion ("Urges")
 Dr. Magnus Pyke – voiceovers ("She Blinded Me With Science")
 Matthew Seligman – Moog bass ("She Blinded Me With Science", "One of Our Submarines")
 Miriam Stockley – backing vocals ("She Blinded Me With Science")
 Bruce Woolley – monk voice (track 3), backing vocals (tracks 6, 7; "Radio Silence (Guitar Version)")
 Akiko Yano – backing vocals (track 8)

Technical
 Thomas Dolby – producer, cover
 Wally Brill – engineer
 Chris Birkett – engineer
 Tim Hunt – engineer
 Chris Stone – engineer
 Mike Hedges – engineer
 Graham Carmichael – engineer
 Martin Levan – engineer
 Peter Woolliscroft – engineer
 Barry Kingston – engineer
 Andrew Douglas – cover, photography
 Carol Hewison – photography assistant
 Bill Smith – layout
 Andy Partridge – co-producer ("Leipzig", "Urges")
 Tim Friese-Greene – co-producer ("She Blinded Me With Science", "One of Our Submarines")

References

Thomas Dolby albums
1982 debut albums
Albums produced by Thomas Dolby
EMI Records albums